Esposa is a locality located in the municipality of Aísa, in Huesca province, Aragon, Spain. As of 2020, it has a population of 45.

Geography 
Esposa is located 90km north-northwest of Huesca.

References

Populated places in the Province of Huesca